James Llewellyn Davies VC (16 March 1886 – 31 July 1917) was a Welsh recipient of the Victoria Cross, the highest and most prestigious award for gallantry in the face of the enemy that can be awarded to British and Commonwealth forces.

Davies was born in March 1886 in the Ogmore Vale, Glamorgan to John and Martha Davies. He married Elizabeth Ann Richards, who was originally from Nantymoel. As a corporal in the 13th Battalion, Royal Welsh Fusiliers (part of the 38th (Welsh) Division), he performed a deed on 31 July 1917 at Polygon Wood, Pilckem Ridge, Belgium which won him the Victoria Cross. However, he died of wounds received during the attack.

On 20 October 1917, the King presented Corporal Davies' Victoria Cross to his widow and his eldest son. His VC is now on display at the Royal Welch Fusiliers Museum, Caernarfon Castle, Caernarfon, Wales.

He was buried in Canada Farm Cemetery (Plot II, B.18), Ypres, Belgium.

References

Further reading 
Details at the Victoria Cross website
Monuments to Courage (David Harvey, 1999)
The Register of the Victoria Cross (This England, 1997)
VCs of the First World War - Passchendaele 1917 (Stephen Snelling, 1998)

1886 births
1917 deaths
British military personnel killed in World War I
British Army personnel of World War I
British World War I recipients of the Victoria Cross
Royal Welch Fusiliers soldiers
People from Bridgend County Borough
British Army recipients of the Victoria Cross
Welsh recipients of the Victoria Cross
Welsh military personnel